Eveline Braun, (née Hamann; 6 August 1942 – 28 October 2007) commonly known as Evelyn Hamann, was a German actress best known for her work with popular German comedian Loriot as well as for her appearances in television series such as The Black Forest Clinic and Adelheid und ihre Mörder.

Private life 
She was born into a family of musicians in Hamburg, Germany. Her father Bernhard Hamann was a violinist, the concertmaster of the NDR symphony orchestra, and founder of the Hamann Quartet; her mother was a singer and music teacher, and her brother Gerhard was a professor of cello at the Trossingen School of Music. Evelyn Hamann liked to keep her private life out of the public eye, so little is known about her life off-camera. Between 1964 and 1976 she was married to Hans Walter Braun, whom she met while acting in Hamburg. After her divorce she lived with her partner, actor Stefan Behrens.

She died from lymphoma during the night of 28 to 29 October 2007 in Hamburg.

Education and first work
After an acting course at Hamburg University of Music and the Performing Arts, where she was taught by Eduard Marks, among others, Hamann started a career on the stage. She took on small roles at the Thalia Theater, and from 1968 her stage career took her to Göttingen, Heidelberg and Bremen, where she played Marthe Schwertlein in Goethe's Urfaust.

Acting career
From 1976 Evelyn Hamann featured in many comedy sketches in Loriot's television programmes, for example as TV announcer in Englische Ansage. Her comedic shtick often consisted of stiffly formal, deadpan reactions, even in the most absurd situations.

Hamann acted in Loriot's films Ödipussi (1987) and Pappa Ante Portas (1991). She also appeared in the film Piratensender Powerplay (1982) starring famous German entertainers Thomas Gottschalk and Mike Krüger.

Hamann appeared as housekeeper Karsta Michaelis in the television soap opera The Black Forest Clinic in the 1980s and later as Thea in medical drama Der Landarzt (The Country Doctor).

From 1992 to 2006 she played the title role in the ARD television series Adelheid und ihre Mörder (Adelheid and her murderers).

Literary readings 
Evelyn Hamann also read authors' works aloud at literary readings and narrated audiobooks, including Patricia Highsmith's crime thrillers.

Selected filmography 
Source:

Television 
 1985–1989 – The Black Forest Clinic
 1987 – 
 1989/1991/1992 – Der Millionenerbe
 1989/1991/1992 – Kein pflegeleichter Fall
 1991 – Glückliche Reise
 1992 – Vater braucht eine Frau
 1992–1999 – Evelyn Hamann Specials
 1993–2005 – Evelyn Hamanns Geschichten aus dem Leben
 1992–2006 – Adelheid und ihre Mörder
 1995 – Das Traumschiff
 1998 – Wut im Bauch
 1999 – Ehe-Bruch

Film 
 1982 – Piratensender Powerplay
1987 – Ödipussi
 1990 – Pappa ante Portas

Awards 
Source:

 1977 – Goldene Kamera ("Best supporting role" with Loriot)
 1987 – Goldene Kamera (3rd place for "Best Comedy" for "Evelyn und die Männer")
 1993 – Order of Merit of the Federal Republic of Germany
 1997 – Telestar "Best actress in a series" for "Adelheid und ihre Mörder"
 1997 – Bayerischer Fernsehpreis "Best actress in a series" for "Adelheid und ihre Mörder"
 1997 – Goldene Kamera
 1998 – Honorary Superintendent of the Bavarian Police Force
 2000 – Deutscher Videopreis (with Loriot)
 2002 – Münchhausen Prize

See also
 Loriot
 German television comedy
 List of German language comedians

References

External links 

 
 Hollywood Reporter: German actress Evelyn Hamann dies
 Short biography in German
 German newspaper article reporting her death

1942 births
2007 deaths
Actresses from Hamburg
Deaths from lymphoma
German women comedians
German television actresses
German film actresses
Deaths from cancer in Germany
Hochschule für Musik und Theater Hamburg alumni
Officers Crosses of the Order of Merit of the Federal Republic of Germany
20th-century German actresses
20th-century comedians